Across the Line is a programme on BBC Radio Ulster (92– 95 FM). It broadcasts Monday, 9.30pm to 11.00 pm, presented by Gemma Bradley. It is also known for its popular website at www.bbc.co.uk/atl.

Support for Northern Ireland music and musicians in central to the Across the Line editorial brief.  Since its inception in 1986 as The Bottom Line, the programme has championed Northern Irish rock music and in particular bands from Northern Ireland.

Regular contributors have included Stuart Bailie (who also writes for NME magazine), Phil Taggart (BBC Radio 1), Niall Byrne (Nialler 9), Paul McClean, Helen Toland and Bernard Keenan. For several years Rigsy presented alongside Donna Legge and until early 2012 Paul Hamill presented the ATL Dance Show. Across the Line won gold at the PPI Awards (the Irish version of the Sony Radio Academy Awards) in 2008 and 2009 then the equivalent (IMRO) awards in 2020 and 2021.

History 
Established on 8 September 1986, The Bottom Line was named after the Big Audio Dynamite song which the programme used as its theme tune.
The original presenters were Mike Edgar, Davy Sims, Michael Bradley and Barry McIlheney.  Mike Edgar had been drummer with Cruella de Ville and started the programme presenting on Monday, Tuesday and Wednesday evenings.  Davy Sims was the producer and founder of the programme. He had been working in Downtown Radio before joining BBC Radio Ulster and presented the Thursday edition. Michael Bradley "Mickey", had been Bassist with The Undertones. He presented three out of four Friday editions. The monthly London edition of the programme was with Barry McIlheney, former editor of Smash Hits and Empire magazines.

After a short time off air, the programme returned as Across the Line, presented by Mike Edgar. It was broadcast on Sunday nights on Radio Ulster and, between 1990 and 1994 on BBC Radio 5. For much of this time, the programme was broadcast from 10:10–11pm on Radio Ulster, but continuing to midnight on Radio 5. During this period, there were several non-music features such as The Week in the World of Politics, presented by contributors such as Malachi O'Docherty and sketches from The Hole in the Wall Gang who would later go on to star in Radio and TV shows of their own.

After the demise of Radio 5, Across the Line continued as an hour-long Radio Ulster programme, before moving to Monday-Thursday 9-10pm.

The show is aimed at teenagers and young adults (the same target audience as BBC Radio 1, but with a more regional focus). The show is notable for its promotion of local musical talent, actively promoting Snow Patrol before they became widely known. This tradition continues with the regular "That New Band Smell" section on the show.

Over its three decade span ATL radio has had various core presenters for the main indie and rock shows most notably Mike Edgar, Donna Legge, Rory McConnell and Paul McClean (co-presenting) and Rigsy (David O'Reilly) but has also regularly entertained guest presenters and co-presenters such as Michael McKeegan from Therapy?, Snow Patrol, David Holmes, Radiohead, In Case of Fire, Two Door Cinema Club and General Fiasco.

Since 1999 Dance and club life has played an important role. Initiated by Paul McClean, and beginning on Thursday nights, the show has since moved to a Saturday night slot before its current Friday night slot and is dedicated to Electronic music from Hip-hop and House music to Drum and bass and techno and is presented by Belfast club DJ Paul Hamill with a strong emphasis on supporting the music of local DJs and artists. Recent co-presenters include legendary techno DJ Dave Clarke.

In 2008 Across the Line was awarded the New Irish Music gold award at the prestigious PPI Irish Radio awards, with the same production team gaining a second gold in the Music Special category for the documentary 'A Beautiful Day' about the U2 and Ash waterfront Hall concert in 1998 which arguably had an effect on the NI peace process. Across the Line repeated their success in 2009 lifting the gold award once again.

Early in 2009 the ATL team assemble a line-up for the celebrations of the reopening of the Ulster Hall in Belfast. Broadcasting live from the venue, (and later making its way onto BBC Two NI, the event featured a surprise appearance from Snow Patrol after performances from Ash, Divine Comedy, Duke Special, Therapy?, Foy Vance, Panama Kings, Cashier No.9, Kowalski, LaFaro, Fighting with Wire, The Lowly Knights and many more.

In 2010, Phil Taggart was asked to stand in for regular presenter Rigsy on Across the Line after taking part in a work experience scheme. After that he went on to cover on Across The Line regularly and ended up presenting BBC Introducing in Northern Ireland on Radio 1. Phil currently co-hosts the Phil Taggart and Alice Levine show on BBC Radio 1.

ATL TV
The same team also produce the BBC Northern Ireland television series, ATL TV, presented by Legge and O'Reilly. Colin Murray also appeared on the show. The show has had four series of six shows, in 2004, 2005, 2006 and 2008 with a fifth series of festival highlights broadcast in summer 2008. Each show is made up of live music, music videos which are specially commissioned by ATL (featuring new directing talent) and interviews, mainly featuring bands from Northern Ireland. However Coldplay, Foo Fighters, Chemical Brothers, Stereophonics and other international acts have also appeared. On series four, subversive Irish music scene animators Eyebrowy were commissioned to lampoon Northern Irish musical icons.

ATL Rockschool
ATL Rockschool is a TV 'battle of the bands' on BBC Two Northern Ireland. Hosted by Rigsy and Donna Legge, the final on all three years features six bands from Northern Ireland, with every band member still at school.

The Tides won in 2006, with Busted guitarist James Bourne, Kerrang Editor Paul Brannigan and MTV presenter Emma Griffiths on the judging panel. Nice N' Sleazy won in 2007, with Divine Comedy frontman Neil Hannon, NME writer James Jam and Therapy? bassist Michael Mc Keegan judging. Both bands then played the Tennents ViTal festival in Ormeau Park.

ATL Rockschool returned in January 2008, presented by Rigsy and Jill Morgan and was won by a new act called The Good Fight.

References

External links
Official website

BBC Radio Ulster programmes
BBC Northern Ireland television shows
Radio programmes in Northern Ireland
BBC Radio 5 (former)
1986 radio programme debuts